Domenico Quadri (Domeniko/Dementiy Ivanovich Kvadri; ; 1772 – 1832) was a Russian architect born in Switzerland. He was the author of many classical buildings and architectural ensembles in Saint Petersburg and its surroundings.

Biography 
He was born on 2 October 1772 in Cassina (Agno), near Lugano in Switzerland’s Italian-speaking Ticino canton. He worked on numerous palaces and private residences in Saint Petersburg, alongside his countrymen Giovanni Battista Belli-Bernasconi and Giovanni Battista Lucchini of Montagnola, and Gerolamo Rusca of Agno. He lived in Gatchina, where he was also responsible for many buildings.

Father of a son Viktor, born in Russia, who became a major in the Tsarist army and married Antonina Alexeyvna Bibikova. He was the grandfather of Vladimir Viktorovich Kvadri (1859-?), a Russian and Soviet military engineer and writer, and Viktor Viktorovich Kvadri (1861-1908), an important Russian military author and archaeologist.

He returned from Russia in 1827 and died on 12 January 1833 in Milan.

Works 
 Sheremetyev Palace
 Razumovsky Palace
 Residences on Nevsky Prospekt
 Shcherbatov Mansion (now the Kirovets Centre of Culture and Leisure).
 Church of Saint Nicholas (Lutheran) in Gatchina.

References 

Russian architects
Architects from Ticino
Italian emigrants to the Russian Empire
19th century in Saint Petersburg
1772 births
1833 deaths